Rainui Aroita (born 25 January 1994) is Tahitian footballer who plays for A.S. Tamarii Faa'a and for Tahiti national football team.

Career 
Airota started his career with AS Arue. He left in 2011 Arue and joined to Tahiti First Division club A.S. Tamarii Faa'a. In June 2013 he was called for a trial to Brazilian second division club América Futebol Clube (MG).

International 
He was part of the Tahiti squad at the 2013 FIFA Confederations Cup in Brazil. Airota played his full senior debut on 26 March 2013 against New Caledonia national football team in the Qualification for the FIFA World Cup 2014.

References

1994 births
Living people
French Polynesian footballers
Tahiti international footballers
2013 FIFA Confederations Cup players
2016 OFC Nations Cup players
Association football defenders